George Winston Smart (1890–1941) was an English footballer who played for Stoke.

Career
Smart was born in Bristol and began his career with Welsh side Treharris before joining Stoke in 1911. He played 30 matches in 1911–12 and 15 in 1912–13. He then played for the club during World War I and played four matches in the Football League in 1919–20. He later played for Stafford Rangers.

Career statistics

References

English footballers
Stoke City F.C. players
English Football League players
1890 births
1941 deaths
Treharris Athletic Western F.C. players
Stafford Rangers F.C. players
Association football defenders